This is a list of airlines currently operating in Turks and Caicos Islands.

See also
 List of airlines
 List of defunct airlines of Turks and Caicos Islands

Airlines
Turks and Caicos Islands
Turks and Caicos Islands